The Dubilier Condenser Company was the earliest commercial manufacturer of electronic capacitors (formerly known as condensers) which were widely used in early radio receivers (wireless sets).  The company was founded in New York in 1920 by William Dubilier, who was responsible for many early developments in the field of electronics and radio, including the use of mica in capacitors.  Dubilier was a name commonly found on capacitors in early wireless sets in Britain alongside TCC, Wima and others. Dubilier Condenser was later merged into Cornell-Dubilier.

See also
 History of radio

References

Further reading
 "The Capacitor" magazines (1937 to 1964), Cornell-Dubilier

History of radio
Electronics companies of the United States
Capacitor manufacturers